An industrial loan company (ILC) or industrial bank is a financial institution in the United States that lends money, and may be owned by non-financial institutions. They provide niche financial services nationwide. ILCs offer FDIC-insured deposits and are subject to FDIC and state regulator oversight. All "FDIC-insured entities are subject to Sections 23A and 23B of the Federal Reserve Act, which limits bank transactions with affiliates, including the non-bank parent company." ILCs are permitted to have branches in multiple states (which is permitted by many states on a reciprocal basis). They are regulated and supervised by  state-charters and insured by the Federal Deposit Insurance Corporation. They are authorized to make consumer and commercial loans and accept federally insured deposits. Banks may not accept demand deposits if the bank has total assets greater than $100 million. ILCs are exempted from the Bank Holding Company Act.

ILCs assist numerous charities and provide millions of dollars annually in grants, low interest loans, and service through the Community Reinvestment Act (CRA).  Currently, only seven states offer an ILC bank charter. Most ILCs have been chartered by the Utah Department of Financial Institutions. Other states permitting ILCs include California, Colorado, Minnesota, Indiana, Hawaii, and Nevada.

Origins of the concept 
In 1910, attorney Arthur J. Morris (1881–1973) opened the Fidelity Savings and Trust Company in Norfolk, Virginia, which made small loans to working people under a concept he called the "Morris Plan". Under this lending approach, would-be borrowers had to submit references from two people of like character and earning-power to prove the borrower's creditworthiness, and agreed to repay the loan through the purchase of Installment Thrift Certificates in weekly installments equal to the face value of the loan, less origination and investigative fees. Morris Plan Banks expanded to more than 100 locations in the United States.

Morris Plan banks pioneered the use of automotive financing (through arrangements between the Morris Plan Company of America, essentially a holding company for Morris Plan banks, and the Studebaker Corporation), and, through the subsidiary Morris Plan Insurance Society, credit life insurance (which provided for the loan to be repaid in case the borrower died during the term of the loan, with any residue going to the borrower's estate).

References

 Citing Risks, U.S. Seeks New Rules for Niche Banks New York Times September 16, 2009
 Bank On It - Thanks to luck and a loophole, Utah is an unlikely hub for the nation's industrial banks Salt Lake City Weekly April 22, 2015

External links 
 Financial Reports of Industrial Loan Companies. iBanknet.com - List of largest Industrial loan companies
 FDIC: Advisory Committee on Industrial loan companies June 8, 2004
 The FDIC's Supervision of Industrial Loan Companies: A Historical Perspective. June 25, 2004
 Industrial Loan Companies Come Out of the Shadows. Federal Reserve Bank of St. Louis July 2007
 INDUSTRIAL LOAN CORPORATIONS: Recent Asset Growth and Commercial Interest Highlight Differences in Regulatory Authority. United States Government Accountability Office (GAO).

Financial services in the United States
Loans